The 2019–20 Nemzeti Bajnokság I (known as the K&H férfi kézilabda liga for sponsorship reasons) is the 69th season of the Nemzeti Bajnokság I, Hungarian premier Handball league.

Team information 
As in the previous season, 14 teams played in the 2018–19 season.
After the 2018–19 season, Ceglédi KKSE and Vecsés SE were relegated to the 2019–20 Nemzeti Bajnokság I/B. They were replaced by two clubs from the 2018–19 Nemzeti Bajnokság I/B; Orosházi FKSE and Váci KSE.

Personnel and kits
Following is the list of clubs competing in 2018–19 Nemzeti Bajnokság I, with their president, head coach, kit manufacturer and shirt sponsor.

Managerial changes

League table

Season statistics

Number of teams by counties

See also
 2019–20 Magyar Kupa
 2019–20 Nemzeti Bajnokság I/B
 2019–20 Nemzeti Bajnokság II

References

External links
 Hungarian Handball Federaration 
 hetmeteres.hu

Nemzeti Bajnokság I (men's handball)
2019–20 domestic handball leagues
Nemzeti Bajnoksag I Men